Chiara Fiorini (born 1 February 1956) is a Swiss painter and object artist who lives in Zürich.

Early life
Born in Acquarossa, Chiara Fiorini grew up in the Italian part of Switzerland and attended primary and secondary school there. In 1978 she received a diploma from University of Fribourg.  After that she studied art at the École d'art Martenot and graduated from it in 1981. Then she got a diploma from the École Nationale Supérieure des Beaux-arts in 1983 in Paris.

Solo exhibitions

References

External links

Chiara Fiorini in Sikart
 Chiara Fiorini at Chalice Publishers
Literature about Chiara Fiorini in WorldCat database 
Reference to Chiara Fiorini by Jedlitschka Gallery 
Book illustration by Chiara Fiorini:  „Nataša prende il bus“ von Sara Rossi Guidicelli, Illustrationen Edizioni Ulivo, 2018 
Article about Chiara Fiorini in St. Galler Tagblatt 
Article about Chiara Fiorini in La Regione 
Exhibition catalogue about works by Chiara Fiorini  "Filo Verde"

1956 births
Living people
People from Ticino
Swiss painters
University of Fribourg alumni